Graeme Stoddart (born 30 July 1959 in Newcastle upon Tyne) is a former English–Dutch professional darts player who played in Professional Darts Corporation events. His nickname was Shark.

Career
Stoddart represented Holland in the 1984 European Cup. He came to prominence after being invited from the WDC rankings for the inaugural WDC World Darts Championship in 1994. He was drawn in Group 8, where he defeated Jocky Wilson, before being knocked out in the final group match by the eventual champion, Dennis Priestley.

He entered many majors in the early years of the WDC/PDC, eventually reaching the quarter-finals of the 1998 World Grand Prix, beating Paul Lim, and where he lost to Rod Harrington. He hit a 9-dart finish in the Swiss Open in 2000 (with a set of borrowed darts after leaving his set at home), which was the 2nd recorded in the PDC, after Ronnie Baxter had hit the first in the 1999 Antwerp Open. In 2001, history was created: it was the first year a lady, Gayl King from Canada, entered the WC; she lost 1–3 against Stoddart. 

Stoddart won the 2003 Amsterdam Open he defeating Bert Vlaardingerbroek of Netherlands. 

His last appearance at a PDC event was at a Players Championship event in Scotland in 2009. Stoddart retired from the PDC in 2013 due to health reasons.

World Championship results

PDC
 1994: Last 24 Group (beat Jocky Wilson 3–1 & lost to Dennis Priestley 0–3) (sets)
 1995: Last 24 Group (lost to Peter Evison 2–3 & lost to Cliff Lazarenko 2–3)
 1996: Last 24 Group (lost to Alan Warriner-Little 2–3 & lost to Steve Brown 2–3)
 1997: Last 24 Group (lost to Alan Warriner-Little 2–3 & beat Larry Butler 3–1)
 1998: Last 24 Group (lost to Keith Deller 1–3 & beat Mick Manning 3–0)
 1999: 2nd Round (lost to Peter Manley 0–3)
 2000: 2nd Round (lost to Phil Taylor 0–3)
 2001: 2nd Round (lost to Rod Harrington 0–3)

References
 
 https://www.pdc.tv/players/pdc-nine-dart-club
 http://news.bbc.co.uk/sport1/hi/other_sports/1092774.stm

External links

Living people
English darts players
Professional Darts Corporation former pro tour players
1959 births
Sportspeople from Newcastle upon Tyne